Oruga may refer to:
 Oruga, Spanish for a caterpillar
 Oruga, an articulated bus or "caterpillar" bus
 "Katy La Oruga", a special single by Lucerito